Lysmata californica, known generally as the red rock shrimp or lined shrimp, is a species of caridean shrimp in the family Hippolytidae. It is found in the East Pacific.

References

Further reading

External links
 

Caridea
Crustaceans described in 1866
Articles created by Qbugbot